Brett Camerota (born January 9, 1985) is an American Nordic combined skier. Competing at the 2006 and 2010 Winter Olympics, he won a silver medal in the 4×5 km team event in 2010, while his best individual finish was 36th place in the 10 km individual normal hill event at the same games. His best finish at the FIS Nordic World Ski Championships was 31st in the 15 km individual Gundersen event at Sapporo in 2007. His best individual World Cup finish was 9th in the HS 137/ 10 km event in Oberstdorf, Germany, in 2009. His twin brother, Eric Camerota, is also an Olympic Nordic combined skier.

References 

1985 births
American male Nordic combined skiers
Living people
American twins
Nordic combined skiers at the 2006 Winter Olympics
Nordic combined skiers at the 2010 Winter Olympics
Olympic Nordic combined skiers of the United States
Olympic silver medalists for the United States in Nordic combined
Twin sportspeople
Medalists at the 2010 Winter Olympics